Olav Jørgen Sæter  (26 November 1884 – 24 November 1951 ) was a Norwegian schoolteacher, newspaper editor and politician.

He was born in Elverum to Oluf Sæter and Jøran Hvarstad. He was elected representative to the Storting for six consecutive periods. The first period ran from 1922–1924, while his last period took place from 1937–1945, for the Labour Party.

He edited the newspaper Østerdalens Sosialdemokrat from 1915 to 1932, and served as mayor of Elverum from 1931 to 1940.

References

1884 births
1951 deaths
20th-century Norwegian politicians
People from Elverum
Labour Party (Norway) politicians
Norwegian newspaper editors
Mayors of places in Hedmark
Members of the Storting